The 2019 Little Rock Challenger was a professional tennis tournament played on hard courts. It was the first edition of the tournament which was part of the 2019 ATP Challenger Tour. It took place in Little Rock, Arkansas, United States from 3 to 9 June 2019.

Singles main-draw entrants

Seeds

 1 Rankings are as of 27 May 2019.

Other entrants
The following players received wildcards into the singles main draw:
  Oliver Crawford
  Brandon Holt
  Aleksandar Kovacevic
  Jason Kros
  Tim Smyczek

The following players received entry into the singles main draw using protected rankings:
  Carlos Gómez-Herrera
  Daniel Nguyen
  Raymond Sarmiento

The following player received entry into the singles main draw as an alternate:
  Alejandro González

The following players received entry into the singles main draw using their ITF World Tennis Ranking:
  Nicolás Álvarez
  Jordi Arconada
  Francisco Cerúndolo
  Martin Redlicki
  Alexander Ritschard

The following players received entry from the qualifying draw:
  Garrett Johns
  Orlando Luz

Champions

Singles

  Dudi Sela def.  Lee Duck-hee 6–1, 4–3 ret.

Doubles

  Matías Franco Descotte /  Orlando Luz def.  Treat Huey /  Max Schnur 7–5, 1–6, [12–10].

References

2019 ATP Challenger Tour
2019 in American tennis
June 2019 sports events in the United States
Little Rock Challenger